Hillview is a rural town and locality in the Scenic Rim Region, Queensland, Australia.

Geography 
Hillview occupies a section of Christmas Creek valley where it is joined by Widgee Creek.  Hillview's eastern boundary is marked by the high point of Jinbroken Range.

History 
The town was once a stop on the Beaudesert Shire Tramway.

Christmas Creek Provisional opened on 5 July 1887 (higher up the creek than a previous Christmas Creek Provisional School). In 1901, it became Christmas Creek State School. In 1914, the school was renamed Hillview State School.

The locality contained 25 households, in which 46.5% of the population were males and 53.5% of the population were females with a median age of 51, 13 years above the national average. The average weekly household income is $1,050, $388 below the national average.

Education 
Hillview State School is a government primary (Prep-6) school for boys and girls at 1623 Christmas Creek Road. In 2017, the school had an enrolment of 36 students with 7 teachers (3 full-time equivalent) and 5 non-teaching staff (2 full-time equivalent). In 2018, the school had an enrolment of 29 students with 6 teachers (3 full-time equivalent) and 6 non-teaching staff (3 full-time equivalent).

There is no secondary school in Hillview. The nearest secondary school is Beaudesert State High School in Beaudesert to the north.

Amenities 
The Scenic Rim Regional Council operates a mobile library service which visits Cahill Park on Christmas Creek Road.

See also
 List of tramways in Queensland

References

External links 

Scenic Rim Region
Localities in Queensland